St Maurice is a Roman Catholic church in Stamford, Connecticut, part of the  Diocese of Bridgeport.

History 
Referred to as the Little Church on the Hill, St. Maurice Church is named after Bishop Maurice F. McAuliffe who served as the 8th Bishop of Hartford (1934-1944). The Norman-Gothic Revival church was built in 1936 to the designs of the architectural firm of Polak and Sullivan from New Haven, CT.

References

External links 
  Saint Maurice - Website
 Diocese of Bridgeport

Roman Catholic churches in Stamford, Connecticut